Gretchen Holbrook Gerzina, born in 1950, is an American author and academic who has written mostly historically-grounded biographical studies. Her academic posts have included being the Kathe Tappe Vernon Professor of Biography at Dartmouth College, working as a professor at Vassar College, being a professor and a director of Africana Studies at Barnard College, and as at April 2019 being the Dean of the University of Massachusetts Amherst Commonwealth Honors College. Gerzina was the host of WAMC's nationally syndicated radio program The Book Show for fourteen years, where she interviewed authors.

Selected publications
 1989: Carrington: A Life
 1995: Black England: Life Before Emancipation
 2004: Frances Hodgson Burnett: The unexpected life of the author of The Secret Garden
 2008: Mr. and Mrs. Prince: How an Extraordinary 18th-Century Family Moved out of Slavery and into Legend

References

External links
 Official website.
 Zadie Smith, "Zadie Smith on discovering the secret history of Black England: 'Into my ignorance poured these remarkable facts, The Guardian'', 24 September 2022.

Living people
Year of birth missing (living people)
American women historians
21st-century American women